The Virginia Tech Corporate Research Center, known locally as the 'Corporate Research Center' or the 'CRC' or 'VTCRC', is a science park on the Virginia Tech campus in Blacksburg, Virginia, comprising 33 completed buildings on  of land. The CRC is located adjacent to the Virginia Tech Airport.

Computer science department
Virginia Tech's computer science department, which was previously based in Torgersen Hall, was moved here in 2006.

Companies located in the CRC
The CRC currently has over 170 tenants and attracts technology, research and support companies. A list of tenants can be found at http://www.vtcrc.com/tenant-directory.

See also 
 Virginia Polytechnic Institute and State University
 Virginia Tech#Virginia Tech Foundation
 System X (supercomputer)
 Virginia Tech Foundation

References

External links
 Virginia Tech Corporate Research Center

Virginia Tech